The India cricket team toured England between July and September 2018 to play five Tests, three One Day International (ODIs) and three Twenty20 International (T20Is) matches. India also played a three-day match against Essex in July at Chelmsford.

India won the T20I series 2–1. In the second T20I, MS Dhoni played in his 500th international cricket match. He became the ninth player overall, and the third Indian, to reach this milestone.

England won the ODI series 2–1, making it their eighth consecutive bilateral ODI series win. It also ended India's run of nine previous bilateral series wins, and was the first such loss under the captaincy of Virat Kohli. In the second ODI match, Dhoni became the twelfth batsman to score 10,000 runs in ODIs.

The first Test of the tour, which started on 1 August at Edgbaston, was the 1,000th to be played by the England team, making them the first team to reach this milestone. Ahead of the fifth Test, England's Alastair Cook announced that he would retire from international cricket following the conclusion of the series. In the second innings of the fifth Test, Cook scored a century, becoming only the fifth batsman to score a century in his first and last Test matches. In the process, he moved up to fifth on the list of all-time leading run-scorers in Test cricket, moving ahead of Kumar Sangakkara. In the same match, James Anderson took his 564th wicket, the most wickets in Tests by a fast bowler, going past Glenn McGrath. England went on to win the Test series 4–1.

Squads

Ahead of the tour, Suresh Raina replaced Ambati Rayudu in India's ODI squad, after Rayudu failed a fitness test. India's Jasprit Bumrah was ruled out for the T20I series due to the fractured left thumb while Washington Sundar was ruled out of both T20I and ODI series due to an ankle injury. Deepak Chahar was named as the replacement for Bumrah while Sundar was replaced by Krunal Pandya for the T20I series and Axar Patel for the ODI series. Bumrah was later ruled out of India's squad for the ODI series, and was replaced by Shardul Thakur.

Initially, Dawid Malan was added to the England squad for the first T20I as cover for Tom Curran, who was eventually ruled out of both limited-over series due to injury, with Sam Curran and Malan named as his replacements in England's ODI and T20I squad respectively. Ben Stokes was added to England's squad for the third T20I. Alex Hales was ruled out of the first ODI with a side injury, with Dawid Malan added to England's squad as cover. Eventually, Hales was ruled out of the ODI series with Malan named as his replacement. Malan was then released ahead of the third ODI to play in the England Lions squad, with James Vince replacing him. Sam Billings was included in England's squad for the third ODI, as cover for Jason Roy.

Wriddhiman Saha, India's usual Test wicket-keeper, had not fully recovered from the thumb injury that he sustained in the 2018 Indian Premier League (IPL) and went on to miss the series. Initially, he was left out of India's squad for the first three Tests along with Bhuvneshwar Kumar, who underwent further fitness assessments after aggravating an injury in the final ODI. On 19 July, Saha was ruled out of the entire tour with a shoulder injury. Kumar was not selected for the final two Tests. Prithvi Shaw and Hanuma Vihari were added to India's squad for the final two Tests, with Murali Vijay and Kuldeep Yadav being dropped.

Ahead of the first Test, Jos Buttler was appointed as vice-captain of the England team for the Test series. Ollie Pope replaced Dawid Malan in the squad for the second Test, with Chris Woakes called up to replace Ben Stokes. Stokes rejoined England's squad for the third Test, replacing Sam Curran, after being found not guilty in a case of affray that took place in September 2017. James Vince was added to England's squad for the fourth Test as cover for Jonny Bairstow. England recalled Moeen Ali and Sam Curran for the fourth Test, replacing Ollie Pope and Chris Woakes. Jos Buttler was also named as the wicket-keeper for the match, after Jonny Bairstow injured a finger during the third Test. Bairstow resumed his role as wicket-keeper for the fifth and final Test of the series.

T20I series

1st T20I

2nd T20I

3rd T20I

ODI series

1st ODI

2nd ODI

3rd ODI

Tour match

Three-day match: Essex vs India

Test series

1st Test

2nd Test

3rd Test

4th Test

5th Test

Notes

References

External links
 Series home at ESPN Cricinfo

2018 in English cricket
2018 in Indian cricket
International cricket competitions in 2018
Indian cricket tours of England